Princess Anna Alojza Ostrogska (1600–1654) was a Polish–Lithuanian noblewoman and heiress, known for her great fortune, and famously pious and ascetic lifestyle.

Anna was daughter of voivode of Wołyń Price Oleksander Ostrogski h. Ostrogski, the son of voivode of Kijów (Kyiv, also Kiev) Prince Konstanty Wasyl Ostrogski h. Ostrogski and Countess Zofia Tarnowska h. Leliwa and Anna Kostka h. Dąbrowa, the daughter of Jan Kostka h. Dąbrowa and Zofia Odrowąż h. Odrowąż.

Marriage and issue

Anna Alojza married Hetman Jan Karol Chodkiewicz h. Kościesza on 28 November 1620  in Jarosław. They had no children.

Bibliography
 Wanda Dobrowolska: Chodkiewiczowa z ks. Ostrogskich Anna Alojza. W: Polski Słownik Biograficzny. T. 3: Brożek Jan – Chwalczewski Franciszek. Kraków: Polska Akademia Umiejętności – Skład Główny w Księgarniach Gebethnera i Wolffa, 1937, s. 370–371. Reprint: Zakład Narodowy im. Ossolińskich, Kraków 1989, .
 Tomasz Jurasz: Karoca
 Jerzy Antoni Kostka: Kostkowie herbu Dąbrowa. Wyd. Z.P. POLIMER Koszalin  2010, .
 Testament Anny Alojzy z Ostrogskich Chodkiewiczowej, [w:] Testamenty szlacheckie z ksiąg grodzkich wielkopolskich z lat 1631–1655, Poznań – Wrocław 2008.

References

1600 births
1654 deaths
People from Jarosław
People from Ruthenian Voivodeship
Anna Alojza Ostrogska
Chodkiewicz family
Polish–Lithuanian Commonwealth people